Elisa is a Mexican telenovela produced by Televisa and originally transmitted by Telesistema Mexicano.

Cast 

 Silvia Derbez
 Enrique del Castillo

References 

Mexican telenovelas
Televisa telenovelas
1959 telenovelas
1959 Mexican television series debuts
1959 Mexican television series endings
Spanish-language telenovelas